Sven Låftman (December 16, 1887 – July 5, 1977) was a Swedish athlete.  He competed at the 1908 Summer Olympics in London.

Låftman won his preliminary heat in the 200 metres with a time of 23.8 seconds, the slowest winning time in the round.  This qualified Låftman to compete in the semifinals, but he did not start in his semifinal heat.

He did not advance to the semifinals in the 400 metres after placing third and last in his preliminary heat.

References

Sources
 
 
 

1887 births
1977 deaths
Athletes (track and field) at the 1908 Summer Olympics
Olympic athletes of Sweden
Swedish male sprinters